Piétrain is a village of Wallonia and a district of the municipality of Jodoigne, located in the province of Walloon Brabant, Belgium. The village Herbais lies south of the sub-municipality.

References

Jodoigne
Former municipalities of Walloon Brabant